Werner Hosewinckel Christie may refer to:

 Werner Hosewinckel Christie (1877–1927), Norwegian agricultural researcher
 Werner Hosewinckel Christie (officer) (1917–2004), Norwegian air force officer
 Werner Hosewinckel Christie (1746–1822)
 Werner Christie (Werner Hosewinckel Christie, born 1949), Norwegian politician for the Labour Party